Wingrave is an Egyptian horror film written and directed by Ahmed Khalifa and starring Ashraf Hamdi, Diana Brauch, and Karim Higazy. It was the first English-Language Egyptian feature film in history. The film was designed as a tribute to Gothic literature, Expressionist Cinema, and the ghost story genre.

Plot
As renowned parapsychologist Henry Wingrave struggles conducting a forbidden seance, he recollects three of his most disturbing and challenging experiences with the restless dead. Throughout these experiences, he is asked to contact the dead brother of a grieving young woman, to cleanse a newly bought house of the malicious entities, and to determine whether a young woman is possessed by a demon, or simply insane.

Production
The film was the shot in 9 days in Alexandria and Cairo with a budget of $7,500.

The film's crew consisted of Writer/Director Ahmed Khalifa, Production Manager Noha Said, and Assistant Director Mohamed Waheed.

The film was the first Egyptian film to be exclusively distributed in the U.S. on DVD and to be available for paid download and Video on Demand (VOD).

References

External links
 
 

2007 horror films
2007 films
Egyptian horror films
English-language Egyptian films
2000s English-language films